Clayton McKenzie Morrow (born July 3, 1974) is an American animator, writer, director, storyboard artist and storyboard director. He is the son of Oscar and Emmy winning screenwriter Barry Morrow.

Life and career 
Morrow was born in July 1974 to Emmy and Oscar award-winning screenwriter Barry Morrow (born 1948) in Hennepin County, Minnesota. He is sometimes credited as Clayton M. Morrow and Clay Morrow (not to be confused with the fictional character of the same name). He has been married to Cindy Morrow, who is also an animator, since December 1, 1998. They have one child.

For Dexter's Laboratory, created by Genndy Tartakovsky, he served as one of the storyboard artists for 13 episodes, later working on The Powerpuff Girls, created by Craig McCracken, for 8 episodes. In 2001, he wrote and storyboarded the television film The Flintstones: On the Rocks, based on the cartoon series sitcom by Hanna-Barbera. His wife Cindy also wrote and storyboarded the film.

He then worked at Disney Television Animation, in which he worked on Paul Rudish's Mickey Mouse shorts from 2013 until 2016, later returning from 2018 to 2019 but was not involved in its sequel series The Wonderful World of Mickey Mouse. He served as the storyboard director for Camp Lazlo for 15 episodes and worked on Chowder for 9 episodes. Morrow serves as the supervising director for The Cuphead Show!, which was released on Netflix in 2022. Morrow also worked on Kick Buttowski: Suburban Daredevil from 2011 until 2012 and served as the dialogue director and supervising producer for Billy Dilley's Super-Duper Subterranean Summer including The Grim Adventures of Billy & Mandy for two episodes.

Morrow was also an story artist for the 2011 DreamWorks Animation film, Puss in Boots, serving as an spin-off to the Shrek film series, also again serving as an story artist for Foster's Home for Imaginary Friends, and Secret Mountain Fort Awesome  He was also the retake director for Wander Over Yonder and served as a writer on Fish Hooks for only an episode.

Filmography

Director
 2011–2012: Kick Buttowski: Suburban Daredevil
 2013–2016, 2018–2019: Mickey Mouse
 2013–2014: Wander Over Yonder (retake director)
 2017: Billy Dilley's Super-Duper Subterranean Summer (supervising producer and dialogue director)
 2022: The Cuphead Show! (supervising director)

Storyboard artist
 1998–2003: Dexter's Laboratory - 13 episodes
 1998–2001: The Powerpuff Girls - 8 episodes
 2001: The Flintstones: On the Rocks - TV movie
 2002: Whatever Happened to... Robot Jones? - 3 episodes
 2004–2005: Foster's Home for Imaginary Friends - 3 episodes
 2007: The Grim Adventures of Billy and Mandy - 2 episodes
 2007–2010: Chowder - 9 episodes
 2010–2012: Kick Buttowski: Suburban Daredevil - 6 episodes
 2010: Fish Hooks - 1 episode
 2011–2012: Secret Mountain Fort Awesome - 3 episodes
 2011: Puss in Boots - Feature film
 2013–2016, 2018–2019: Mickey Mouse
 2017: Billy Dilley's Super-Duper Subterranean Summer

Writer
 2000-2001: The Powerpuff Girls - 4 episodes
 2001: The Flintstones: On the Rocks - TV movie
 2002: Whatever Happened to... Robot Jones? - 3 episodes
 2002–2003: Dexter's Laboratory - 6 episodes
 2005–2007: Camp Lazlo - 16 episodes
 2010–2012: Kick Buttowski: Suburban Daredevil - 2 episodes
 2010: Fish Hooks - 1 episode
 2011–2012: Secret Mountain Fort Awesome - 3 episodes
 2013–2016, 2018–2019: Mickey Mouse
 2017: Billy Dilley's Super-Duper Subterranean Summer
 2022: The Cuphead Show! - 12 episodes

Story
 2001–2003: Dexter's Laboratory - 26 episodes
 2004: The Powerpuff Girls - 1 episode
 2005: Foster's Home for Imaginary Friends - 1 episode
 2007–2010: Chowder - 9 episodes

Storyboard Director
 2005–2007: Camp Lazlo'' - 15 episodes

References

External links
 

1974 births
American animators
American male screenwriters
Living people
Emmy Award winners
American television writers
Animation screenwriters
American male television writers
American storyboard artists